The enzyme methionine decarboxylase catalyzes the chemical reaction

L-methionine  3-methylthiopropyl amine + CO2

This enzyme belongs to the family of lyases, specifically the carboxy-lyases, which cleave carbon-carbon bonds.  The systematic name of this enzyme class is L-methionine carboxy-lyase (3-methylthiopropyl amine-forming). Other names in common use include L-methionine decarboxylase and L-methionine carboxy-lyase.

References

 

EC 4.1.1
Enzymes of unknown structure